Sonia Ahmed (Urdu: سونیا احمد) (born 23 August 1980) as Sonia Iqbal Ahmed, is a Kuwait-born Canadian Pakistani and founder of Miss Canada Pakistan Inc., now known as Miss Pakistan World, Mr. Pakistan World and Mrs. Pakistan World that were first held in 2002 in Toronto, Ontario, Canada.  

In 2021, she established the Miss Trans Pakistan pageant.

Biography
Sonia Ahmed was born in Kuwait to Arain Punjabi father from Lahore, Punjab and mother is from Karachi, Sindhi. She spent her childhood in Kuwait and did her high school and university in Ottawa, Canada. Ahmed is a certified accountant. She views herself as a progressive working to liberate Pakistani women and showcase the beauty and talent of the new Pakistani generation.

Career

Pakistan's Pageant Industry
In 2002, Ahmed created a beauty pageant called Miss Canada Pakistan and changed its name to Miss Pakistan World in 2006. She created Mrs. Pakistan World in 2007, for married women of Pakistani descent. She created Mr Pakistan World in 2011, and moved the event to New Jersey, USA in 2014.

In 2020, Ahmed, brought the pageant to Lahore, Pakistan where the first Miss Pakistan World was crowned on the soil of Pakistan, Areej Chaudhary. After, alomost 20 years of holding the pageant in the USA and Canada, girls from the soil of Pakistan were being accepted. 

On May 25, 2021, during the pandemic, Ahmed created the first Miss Trans Pakistan for trans women of Pakistani descent and the first trans girl to be crowned was Shyraa Roy.

Entering Film Work
In 2014, Ahmed filmed her first documentary, "I Shall Dance," under her production company, Touchgate Global Inc., which was released in September 2014 in Toronto, Ontario, Canada.

Filmography

Controversies
Ahmed faced opposition on her holding the pageant from some conservative sections of the community. However the opposition soon ended.    In August 2010, Ahmed was criticized for going ahead with the 8th annual Miss Pakistan World during the month of Ramadan and while Pakistan faced a humanitarian crisis due to widespread flooding.

See also
 Miss Pakistan World
 Mrs. Pakistan World

References

External links
 
 ANI Interview
 Official Sonia Ahmed Site
 Toronto Star Article 

1980 births
Living people
Businesspeople from Karachi
Businesspeople from Ottawa
Businesspeople from Toronto
Canadian businesspeople of Pakistani descent
Canadian people of Pakistani descent
Canadian people of Punjabi descent
Pakistani expatriates in Kuwait
Pakistani Sunni Muslims
Pakistani women
Punjabi people
Punjabi women
University of Ottawa alumni